Owen McNally (20 June 1906 – 1973) was a Scottish professional footballer who played as a forward. He began his senior career with Celtic but his first team opportunities were restricted by Jimmy McGrory. After loans spells with Arthurlie and Hamilton Academical, he left the club and embarked on a nomadic playing career that included spells in Ireland, Switzerland and the English Football League.

Career
After playing for junior side Denny Hibernian, McNally joined Celtic and made his professional debut on 9 April 1927 in a 3–3 draw with Dundee United. At the start of the following season, he was loaned to Scottish Second Division side Arthurlie. On 1 October 1927, he scored eight goals in a single match during a 10–0 victory over Armadale, the joint record for the most goals scored by a single player in a Scottish Football League match. After a prolific season with Arthurlie, he returned to Celtic for the 1927–28 season. He scored his first goal for the club against Hamilton Academical but made only two appearances during the season as he struggled to displace Jimmy McGrory from the first team. After a further season behind McGrory and a loan spell with Hamilton, he decided to move on, signing for Irish side Bray Unknowns. In the 1930–31 season, he finished as the club's top goalscorer with 21 league goals as they finished eighth.

In 1931, he signed for Cardiff City; however, after playing in five consecutive matches without scoring at the start of the 1930–31 season, he was replaced by Albert Keating. He made one further appearance before returning to Bray Unknowns soon after. He returned to the Football League in 1933 for a brief spell with Norwich City but was unable to break into the first team. He later played for Swiss side Lausanne, Stenhousemuir, Sligo Rovers and Lisburn Distillery.

In January 1936, he joined Football League Second Division side Leicester City for a fee of £1000. He made his debut for the club on 30 January 1936 in a 1–1 draw with Nottingham Forest and went on to score seven goals in sixteen league appearances. He eventually lost his place in the side to Jack Bowers and left to join French side Calais before finishing his career with Shamrock Rovers. He finished the 1939–40 season as Rovers' top goalscorer with fourteen league goals as they finished as winners of the League of Ireland.

Honours
Shamrock Rovers
 League of Ireland winner: 1939–40

References

1906 births
1973 deaths
Scottish footballers
Footballers from Falkirk (council area)
People from Denny, Falkirk
Denny Hibernian F.C. players
Celtic F.C. players
Arthurlie F.C. players
Hamilton Academical F.C. players
Bray Unknowns F.C. players
Cardiff City F.C. players
FC Lausanne-Sport players
Stenhousemuir F.C. players
Sligo Rovers F.C. players
Lisburn Distillery F.C. players
Leicester City F.C. players
Calais RUFC players
Shamrock Rovers F.C. players
Scottish Football League players
English Football League players
Association football forwards
Scottish Junior Football Association players
League of Ireland players
NIFL Premiership players
Scottish expatriate sportspeople in Ireland
Expatriate association footballers in the Republic of Ireland
Scottish expatriate footballers
Expatriate footballers in Switzerland
Expatriate footballers in France
Scottish expatriate sportspeople in Switzerland
Scottish expatriate sportspeople in France
Swiss Super League players